Gabriela Hearst (née Perezutti) born in Paysandú Department, Uruguay, (November 3, 1976) is a women's luxury ready-to-wear and accessories designer. In addition to designing her namesake collection, she runs and operates her family's ranch in Uruguay.

Early life and education 
Hearst grew up on her family's ranch in Paysandú Department, Uruguay which is around 400 km away from the capital city, Montevideo. She attended The British School of Montevideo and attended the Universidad ORT Uruguay with a B.A. in communications. In her early 20s, after a short period in Paris, she moved to New York to study performing arts at the Neighborhood Playhouse School of Theatre.

Career 
In 2004, she started Candela in Brooklyn with $700. The collection was made of T-shirts with silk-screened illustrations of a winged woman on top of a horse (based on a photo of her mother). In 2006, the collection expanded to ready-to-wear and shoes.

After eleven years working in design, Hearst became a member of the CFDA in 2012.

In fall 2015, Hearst launched her eponymous label: Gabriela Hearst. The brand has been compared as an American competitor to Hermès for its high-quality and fine use of garments. The collections are characterized by quality craftsmanship, high-end and innovative materials, such as the anti-radiation fabric that shields against the radiation emitted by mobile phones—introduced in the Resort 2017 collection as lining for the jacket pockets—or the ultra-fine 14.5 micron merino wool and the aloe-treated linen introduced in the Resort 2018 collection, a sustainable and utilitarian process that instantly softens the linen and gives the fabric the property to moisturize the skin. Also the production is very attentive to the environment and sustainability, including the use of wool coming from Hearst's sheep farm in Uruguay, an end-to-end production cycle that helps minimizing the environmental impact. Hearst is also the first brand that make use of Tipa compostable bio-plastics for all their packaging—an Israeli startup that is developing a flexible alternative to plastic that can be thrown into compost to decompose in 24 weeks.

Her line's first bag was the Nina Bag (named after Nina Simone), which started as a limited edition of 20 that Hearst gave to women she admired—some of them high-profile like Miroslava Duma and Brie Larson—as well as to women she enjoyed collaborating with, such as the owner of the factory or the shoe developer. The bag now has an extensive waiting list.

In January 2016, Hearst was included in the "Ten of Tomorrow" by Women's Wear Daily (WWD).

On September 9, 2017, Gabriela Hearst was added to the Business of Fashion BOF500 2017—the professional index of the people shaping the global fashion industry.

In January 2019, LVMH Luxury Ventures, the fund launched by French luxury giant LVMH to support "already iconic" emerging brands, invested in Gabriela Hearst, allowing the brand to expand their presence around the world. Since the fund creation in 2017, this investment is the first in a creative label.

In January 2021 Hearst designed the dress worn by First Lady Dr. Jill Biden for the 2021 presidential inauguration: an ivory dress representing the new administration's message of unity that was embroidered with each of the 50 state's flowers and that of D.C.

In December 2021 Hearst was nominated by the Financial Times as one of the 25 most influential women of the year.

Chloé 
In December 2020 Hearst was named Creative Director of Chloé, the luxury prêt-à-porter brand launched in 1952 by Gaby Aghion. Gabriela Hearst is the first female designer with a multicultural heritage to both Uruguay and the United States to take the helm of a Paris fashion house.

For her debut collection at Chloé, Hearst paid homage to the founder of the maison, Gaby Aghion, in the year of the brand's centenary with a collection that focuses on sustainability. The scalloped details, which Aghion applied to a cotton piqué dress in her 1960 show at Brasserie Lipp appeared as top-stitching on georgette blouses, in leather petals or patchwork denim, as a quilting technique, and along the cuffs of knitwear. The Broderie anglaise is transformed from classic to contemporary as a knitwear, and as a leather edge while the iconic Edith Bag has been reissued repurposing 50 vintage bags bought on eBay. Hearst also collaborated with nonprofit founder Bass Timmer to create backpacks made from deadstock, whose sales will donate two Sheltersuits (a garment with a technical outer shell that can turned into a sleeping bag) to homeless people.

Sustainability 
On February 14, 2017, Gabriela Hearst presented its first runway show at the Refectory of the High Line Hotel. The Angela Davis–inspired collection, while luxurious, had a non-wasteful approach. The catwalk show was aimed at minimizing the environmental waste through a no-plastic policy, furnished with pews and chairs borrowed from her home and office. Cashmere pillows for guests were knitted by the nonprofit organization Manos del Uruguay from excess yarn from her previous collection and seven sets of clothes were made with existing fabrics and materials.

With FW18 collection, Hearst became the first brand to introduce compostable bio-plastics for all their packaging. A flexible alternative to plastic that can be thrown into compost to decompose in 24 weeks, developed by an Israel startup called TIPA Sustainable Packaging.

For spring/summer 2020, Gabriela Hearst became the first brand to stage a carbon-neutral fashion. In collaboration with Bureau Betak and EcoAct, an international advisory council that works with businesses to address sustainability challenges, Gabriela Hearst worked on reducing the carbon footprint of her show. This has been possible by booking models that did not have to fly, using catering services that cook with local and seasonal food, and reducing all the appliances backstage. In addition, she will be offsetting emissions by donating the energy costs associated with production to the Hifadhi-Livelihoods Project in Kenya, a country where Hearst has traveled in the past with Save the Children. The offset funds will be used to provide modern, efficient cookstoves to families in Kenya's Embu and Tharaka Nithi counties, cutting down on wood usage and the noxious fumes that accompany it, which primarily impact women and children.

Looking forward to the future of sustainability, with SS20 collection Hearst introduced the digital identity for collections—in partnership with Eon. The digital identity connects all products with a QR Code providing each garment's origin, material, production process and carbon footprint of the product. This technology  provides customers more transparency about the clothes and better understanding on how to recycle the products in a move toward a circular fashion economy.

AW20 collection was themed around "waste". Products have been made from repurposed Turkish kilim remnants to make outerwear, old pieces from Hearst stock disassembled and reconstructed and 30% of the collection has been made with recycled cashmere, hand-knitted by the Mano del Uruguay collective. The decoration of the runway show was made by giant shredded paper bales acted as visual metaphor of the "waste" theme.

Hearst sets a goal to use 80% deadstock in 2023 and no use of virgin materials by 2022.

Fusion 
In November 2022, Hearst participated at the 27th United Nations Climate Change Conference of the Parties (CoP27) in Sharm El-Sheikh (Egypt) to discuss the critical role fusion power has in the fight against climate change.

Hearst dedicated her Chloé Spring Summer 2023 collection to creating awareness around fusion energy, with her team they researched fusion and learnt from engineers, scientists and both the private sector (Commonwealth Fusion System and Helion Energy) and the public sector (Iter and the UK Atomic Energy Authority) to work on the collection.

Vanity Fair documented her visit to the tokamak building at the ITER campus in the South of France with an extensive article titled "How Chloé’s Gabriela Hearst Turned Her Climate Obsession Into High Fashion”

Notable clients 
Hearst's collections have been worn by celebrities, including Gillian Anderson, Laura Dern, Miroslava Duma, Lena Dunham, Dakota Fanning, Selena Gomez, Gugu Mbatha-Raw, Anne Hathaway, Rebecca Hall, Naomi Harris, Lauren Hutton, Gwen Jorgesen, Mindy Kaling, Brie Larson,  Demi Moore, Emma Stone, Emma Watson, Allison Williams, Meghan Markle, Zoe Kravitz, Oprah, Diane Lane, Carey Mulligan, Julia Roberts, Danai Gurira, Patricia Clarkson, Gemma Chan, Hilary Swank, Lady Gaga, Amal Clooney, Amy Adams, Uma Thurman, Christine Baranski, Carolyn Murphy, Rosie Huntington-Whiteley, Vanessa Kirby, Julianna Margulies, Glenn Close, Gabrielle Union, Angelina Jolie, Jessica Lange, Lorena Ponce De León, and Jill Biden.

Collaborations 
For the Fall 2016 collection, she partnered with Manos del Uruguay, a nonprofit organization that pays living wages to craftswoman who handmade the tweeds using wool from her farm.

In April 2016, she collaborated with Peter Miles on the design of signature socks used as a parting gift for guests at the annual gala of The Paris Review.

In 2017, Hearst collaborated with an Italian mill to produce cloth for fine wool suiting from merino wool from her ranch.

In March 2017, the store Le Bon Marché offered Hearst a space to open her first pop-up shop during Paris Fashion Week.

Following the "no waste" approach of her Fall 2017 collection, Hearst collaborated with Swarovski, who donated stock crystals used on limited-edition starry-night-sky velvet slip dresses in runway looks during New York Fashion Week.

For the Met Gala in 2017, Hearst collaborated with Laura Dern on the design of a modern gown with geometric cutouts and a removable polka dot train to honor the Comme des Garçons style.

In August 2019, Gabriela Hearst opens its London store in Mayfair, at 59 Brook Street. The store, designed in collaboration between Gabriela Hearst and architect Lord Norman Foster, represents the brand's commitment to sustainable design, and shares a core design sensibility with the New York flagship store.

In February 2020, Gabriela Hearst announces its partnership with EON, a leading digital identity platform for the fashion and apparel industry, connecting products throughout their lifecycle by unlocking visibility, traceability, and insight through a QR code. The goal is to provide customers with more transparency by sharing the supply chain and giving them access to learn about their garment's journey.

In 2021, for its Spring Summer show, Gabriela Hearst collaborated with the Navajo community bringing the Americas craft together in a collection along the work of Uruguay and Bolivia, through the work of the non- for- profits they work with. She also showcased on the runway, its shoe collaboration with Clergerie, the last remaining shoemaker that still produces its shoes in the French region of Romans sur Isere.

Philanthropy 
In June 2016, she started a collaboration with Tod's to update their classic slip-on sneaker with a men's brogue detail in Morse code that reads "love"—20 percent of proceeds went to Save the Children. To promote the project, Gabriela Hearst organized a portrait project featuring Dakota Fanning, Miroslava Duma, Lindsey Adelman, Lauren Hutton, and the Save the Children donor Dorrit Morley and member Zaineb Malick.

In May 2017, Hearst produced a hundred pieces of a limited-edition sweater called Ram Ovaries. The design was a representation of strength symbolized by the use of a woman's reproductive system and ram's horns. The profits from the sales were used to support Planned Parenthood.

In July 2017, upon learning that east Africa was facing its worst drought in 70 years, Hearst visited rural Turkana County, Kenya, with Save the Children president and CEO Carolyn Miles. In October 2017, Hearst partnered with Net-a-Porter and Bergdorf Goodman to raise awareness about the humanitarian crisis by making her handbag collection available to the public for the first time. For one week only, bags were available for direct purchase online and at the Bergdorf Goodman store in New York. Gabriela Hearst pledged a donation of $600,000 to Save the Children to give more than 1,000 families of the Turkana region the ability to buy food, water, and livestock to help them survive the drought.

In September 2018, following several philanthropic campaigns, Hearst started serving on the Save the Children's Board of Trustees.

In September 2019, in collaboration with MyTheresa, Hearst launched an 18-piece capsule collection to mark Save the Children centennial year. The collection, with colors inspired by the iconic logo of Save the Children, comprises suits, maxi-length dresses and skirts, knitwear and coats. Twenty percent of the proceeds went to support the organization's Centennial Campaign.

From 2 to 9 December 2019, Hearst donated 100 per cent of her brand's net proceeds to Save the Children to support relief efforts in war-torn Yemen. To support the initiative, Hearst also made her signature bags available for direct purchase online.

For the Spring Summer 2020 show, all guests received a scarf featuring a print of animals that've recently gone extinct, also, Hearst made donations in their name to Our Children's Trust, a nonprofit organization in Oregon that has filed lawsuits against governments for infringing on the children's right to a stable climate system.

From June 29 to July 12, 2020, Hearst teamed up with Net a Porter for a limited two weeks initiative to support Save the Children global relief efforts in the fight against COVID-19. The collaboration featured Hearst signature bags Baez, Nina and Diana, that were made available in the "Bags of Purpose" sale on Net a Porter.

Awards

Retail 
Hearst is currently sold at more than 50 retailers in several countries, including Forty Five Ten, Le Bon Marchè, Net-a-Porter, The Line, Bergdorf Goodman, Selfridges, Matches Fashion, Boon the Shop, Lane Crawford, and others. In November 2018, Hearst opened its first flagship store, located on Madison Avenue, adjacent to the New York institution that is the Carlyle Hotel. Following Hearst's mission on sustainability, the store was built without synthetics or chemicals, using natural, non-treated reclaimed oak. The lifestyle and fashion magazine Vogue has claimed it as "the most beautiful store in New York City".

Since January 2019, Gabriela Hearst has been working along with Sir Norman Foster to design the first London flagship store, which occupies a corner of a late-19th-century building in Mayfair. As all the aspects of Gabriela Hearst brand, every detail of the boutique has been dictated by sustainability. The custom-built Benchmark furniture has been made in Hungerford from a London plane tree that fell in a recent storm in Lincoln, the floor is reclaimed oak herringbone, the lights are on automatic dimmers, the leather has been dyed using non-toxic vegetable dyes, and the curtains are linen rather than cotton. The feeling of the store is described by Gabriela Hearst as "anti-retail", pervaded by serenity and calmness, avoiding the visual over-hyping.

Personal life 
Gabriela Perezutti married John "August" Augustine Hearst in 2013. She currently lives in Manhattan with her husband and their children.

References 

Uruguayan fashion designers
Uruguayan women fashion designers
Uruguayan emigrants to the United States
1976 births
Living people
Hearst family
People educated at The British Schools of Montevideo
People from Paysandú Department